The Brotherhood of Independent Baptist Churches and Ministries of Ukraine was officially founded and registered in Ukraine in 1993.

Structure
The foundation of this new Baptist Union was organized and initiated by a group of churches, which for nearly thirty years had been active members of the Union of Churches movement. Among these churches-initiators there were churches of the Union of Baptist Churches in Kyiv, Zhytomyr, Khartsyzk, Kharkiv, Rivne, Zdolbuniv, etc. Today, the Brotherhood includes more than 100 communities and about 11,000 members.

See also
 Baptists in Ukraine
 Evangelical Baptist Union of Ukraine
 List of Baptist denominations
 Ukrainian Evangelical Baptist Convention of Canada

External links
 Official website of the Brotherhood of Independent Baptist Churches of Ukraine

Protestantism in Ukraine
Baptist denominations in Europe
Baptist denominations established in the 20th century
Independent Baptist denominations